The Council of Ministers is the executive branch of the government of French Polynesia. It is headed and appointed by the President of French Polynesia.

Fritch 2018 cabinet
The current cabinet was appointed by Édouard Fritch on 24 May 2018 following the 2018 French Polynesian legislative election. Six of the Ministers were appointed from the Assembly of French Polynesia, and as a result vacated their seats.

In September 2020 the council was reshuffled following the resignation of Teva Rohfritsch. Tearii Alpha was appointed vice-president and minister of Agriculture, Blue Economy and Industry, Tea Frogier was dropped as a Minister, and Yvonnick Raffin was appointed finance minister. A further reshuffle took place in November 2021 when Alpha was fired as vice-president after refusing to comply with the territory's mandatory vaccination law. He was replaced as vice-president by Jean-Christophe Bouissou, but retained his other portfolios, resulting in Nicole Bouteau resigning from Cabinet in protest. Her portfolios were shared out among other ministers.

A further reshuffle in February 2022 saw Isabelle Sachet leave the Cabinet, and Virginie Bruant and Naea Bennett join it. Bruant became Minister of Labour, Solidarity, Training, Status of Women, Family and Non-autonomous Persons, while Bennett gained responsibility for Youth, Crime Prevention and Sports.

Fritch 2014 Cabinet
Following the removal of Gaston Flosse from office Édouard Fritch appointed his first cabinet in September 2014.

A reshuffle on 27 May 2015 saw Teva Rohfritsch join the cabinet as Minister for Economic Recovery, Blue Economy and Digital. On 8 October 2015 René Temeharo and Frédéric Riveta resigned from Cabinet in order to return to the Assembly and strengthen Fritch's majority. Nicole Sanquer replaced Temeharo as Minister of Youth and Sport, while Fritch took over the agriculture portfolio. A further reshuffle in January 2017 saw Nicole Bouteau replace Jean-Christophe Bouissou as Minister of Tourism, Jacques Raynal replace Patrick Howell as Minister of Health and Solidarity, and Luc Faatau replace Albert Solia as Minister of Equipment. Following the resignation of Nicole Sanquer in July 2017 Tea Frogier replaced her as Minister of Education.

Flosse 2013 cabinet
Gaston Flosse was elected president following the 2013 election, and appointed a Cabinet of 8 Ministers on 17 May 2013.

A reshuffle in November 2013 saw Albert Solia replace Bruno Marty as Minister of Equipment and Transport, and Manolita Ly enter cabinet as the new Minister of Solidarity, Employment, and Women's Rights. Flosse took over the Energy portfolio, while Nuihau Laurey took over the Labour portfolio from Béatrice Chansin.

Temaru 2011 Cabinet
Oscar Temaru was elected following a confidence vote in April 2011 and appointed a cabinet on 5 April 2011. The government stayed in power until the 2013 election.

Antony Géros replaced Pierre Frébault as Minister of Finance in September 2012.

References

External links
 GOUVERNEMENT DE LA POLYNÉSIE FRANÇAISE

Politics of French Polynesia
Government ministers of French Polynesia
French Polynesia